The Russian National Freestyle Wrestling Championships 2015 (World Team Trials) were held in Kaspiysk, Dagestan, Russia in the Ali Aliyev Center, from 8–10 May 2015. The championships were attended by 6-7,000 spectators.

Medal overview

Medal table

Men's freestyle

Results Matches
 57 kg
 Final:  Viktor Lebedev  def.  Ismail Musukaev, 2–1
 Bronze medal:  Azamat Tuskaev def.  Viktor Rassadin, 3–1
 Bronze medal:  Nariman Israpilov def. – Rustam Ampar, by Fall, 2:09
 61 kg
 Final:  Aleksandr Bogomoev def.  Dzhamal Otarsultanov, 3–1
 Bronze medal:  Gadzhimurad Rashidov def.  Bato Badmaev, 3–2
 Bronze medal:  Rustam Abdurashidov def.  Nachyn Kuular,  by Fall, 1:37
65 kg
 Final:  Ilyas Bekbulatov def.  Soslan Ramonov, 4–4
 Bronze medal:  Akhmed Chakaev def.  Alibeggadzhi Emeev, 3–2
 Bronze medal:  Magomed Kurbanaliev def.  Rasul Murtazaliev, 3–2
70 kg
 Final:  Magomedrasul Gazimagomedov def.  Israil Kasumov, 9–0
 Bronze medal:  Yevgeny Zherbaev def.  Magomedkhabib Kadimagomedov, by TF, 15–4
 Bronze medal:  Rasul Dzhukayev def.  Alan Gogaev, 2–0
74 kg
 Final:  Aniuar Geduev def.  Stanislav Khachirov, 6–0
 Bronze medal:  Akhmed Gadzhimagomedov def.  Kakhaber Khubezhty, 7–2
 Bronze medal:  Khabib Batyrov def.  Iakub Shikhdzamalov, 3–1
86 kg
 Final:  Abdulrashid Sadulaev def.  Shamil Kudiyamagomedov, 4–0
 Bronze medal:  Anzor Urishev def.  Akhmed Magomedov,  3–0
 Bronze medal:   Soslan Ktsoyev def.  Vladislav Valiev. 3–0
97 kg
 Final:  Abdusalam Gadisov def.  Vladislav Baitcaev, 7–0
 Bronze medal:  Magomed Ibragimov def.  Tazhudin Mukhtarov, TF, 11–0
 Bronze medal:  Adlan Ibragimov def.  Stanislav Gadzhiev, 6–3
125 kg
 Final:  Khadzhimurat Gatsalov def.  Eduard Bazrov, by Fall, 2:25
 Bronze medal:  Bekhan Dukaev  def.  Felix Tsarikayev, 8–0
 Bronze medal:  Muradin Kushkhov def.  Asadullah Ibragimov, by TF, 12–1

See also 

2015 Russian National Greco-Roman Wrestling Championships
Soviet and Russian results in men's freestyle wrestling

References

External links 
 http://www.wrestrus.ru/turnirs/185
 http://www.vesti.ru/doc.html?id=2563720

Russian National Freestyle Wrestling Championships
Sport in Dagestan
2015 in sport wrestling
2015 in Russian sport
May 2015 sports events in Russia